Image burn-in may refer to:

Afterimage, an optical illusion
Screen burn-in or image persistence